Dendrobium wattii is a species of orchid. It is native to the Himalayas (Assam, Arunachal Pradesh, Yunnan) and to Indochina (Laos, Myanmar, Thailand, Vietnam).

References

wattii
Flora of Indo-China
Flora of the Indian subcontinent
Orchids of India
Orchids of Bangladesh
Orchids of Yunnan
Plants described in 1883
Taxa named by William Jackson Hooker